Jana Kiššová (born 23 November 1974 in Bratislava) is a Slovak manager and former politician. In 2010-2012 and again in 2014-2020 she served as a member of the National Council elected on the Freedom and Solidarity party ballot.

Early life 
Kiššová studied Finance at the University of Economics in Bratislava, graduating in 2001. Following her graduation, she worked as a manager in the HR sector.

Political career 
Kiššová was among the founding members of Freedom and Solidarity in 2009.  She was first elected to parliament in 2010. In the 2012 Slovak parliamentary election, she failed to retain to seat, nonetheless returned to parliament in 2014 as a replacement for Richard Sulík who became a Member of the European Parliament. In 2016 Slovak parliamentary election, she retained her seat. However in 2019 she left Freedom and Solidarity over a conflict with the party leadership and joined a newly founded Democratic Party. Later that year she left the Democratic Party as well and, after 2020 Slovak parliamentary election, retired from politics.

Personal life 
In 2018, she married the businessman Jozef Boskovič.

References 

University of Economics in Bratislava alumni
Freedom and Solidarity politicians
Living people
1974 births
Members of the National Council (Slovakia) 2016-2020
Members of the National Council (Slovakia) 2012-2016
Members of the National Council (Slovakia) 2010-2012
Female members of the National Council (Slovakia)
Politicians from Bratislava